Bill Walsh College Football is an American football video game released for the Super NES, Genesis, and Sega CD. It is one of the earliest video games to deal with the sport at a college level and is built around the fame of coach Bill Walsh. The game was followed by a sequel, Bill Walsh College Football '95.

Summary
The game features 24 teams from the 1992 season and 24 historical teams. Because EA Sports did not acquire the licensing for the names of the more famous schools, these teams carry the names of the school cities and states rather than the school names.

1992 Teams
Arizona
Boston
College Station
Colorado
Columbus
Florida
Georgia
Hawaii
Kansas
Miami
Michigan
Nebraska
Provo
Pullman
Raleigh
S.C.
South Bend
Syracuse
Stanford
State College
Tallahassee
Tennessee
Washington

Gameplay modes
11-week Season Mode with any one of the 1992 teams that ends in a 12-team single elimination playoff.
16-team single elimination playoff with any team from the 1992 season without a regular season mode.
16-team single elimination playoff with any of the all-time teams.

Reception

Computer Gaming World in 1993 stated that the Genesis version of Bill Walsh College Football "provides the best sports action yet to be seen in a cartridge product". The magazine praised the AI as being "head and shoulders above any other sports game. Simply put, it reacts". Computer Gaming World concluded that while computer-based sports games remained superior, Walsh was an example of those that made purchasing a console "more than worthwhile".

References

External links
 Bill Walsh College Football (Sega Genesis at GameFAQs
 Bill Walsh College Football (Sega CD) at GameFAQs
 Bill Walsh College Football (Super NES) at GameFAQs

1993 video games
Cancelled Game Boy games
College football video games
EA Sports games
Electronic Arts franchises
Electronic Arts games
Sega CD games
Sega Genesis games
Super Nintendo Entertainment System games
Multiplayer and single-player video games
NCAA video games
Video games scored by Brian L. Schmidt
Video games scored by Russell Lieblich
Video games based on real people
Walsh
Walsh
Video games developed in the United States